Helmuth Ehrhardt was a German psychiatrist.

Life 
Ehrhardt was a student of Werner Villinger. In a biography on Villinger, which Ehrhardt authored, he commended Villinger and Max de Crinis. Ehrhardt downplayed the seriousness of the crimes these men had committed with the Nazi T-4 Euthanasia Program. Ehrhardt later went on to serve on the executive board of the World Federation of Mental Health.

References 

Year of birth missing
Year of death missing
German psychiatrists
Physicians in the Nazi Party